Luftwaffe personnel structure consisted of two broad categories, Wehrmachtangehörige or members of the armed forces, and Wehrmachtgefolge or auxiliaries of the armed forces.

The Wehrmachtangehörige consisted of Soldaten or military personnel in a limited sense (officers and enlisted), and Beamten or military officials, either belonging to the general category of Wehrmachtbeamte, or one of four Sondergruppen (special groups of officials): Engineers, Navigators, Aircraft Pilots or Flying Safety. In 1944 supply officers and judge-advocates were transferred from the Officials category, to the Soldiers category as officers of the Truppensonderdienst. As a war-time measure, Sonderführers were introduced, filling positions normally held by trained officers or non-commissioned officers without having the required military training. Beamte auf Kriegsdauer (war-time officials) were filling positions normally held by trained officials, without having the required civil service training.

The Wehrmachtgefolge consisted in peace-time of civilian salaried employees and workers of the Luftwaffe. During the war several new classes of full or par time duty personnel were added to the Wehrmachtgefolge, such as: Luftschutzwarndienst, the male personnel of the air raid warning service; Sicherheits- und Hilfsdienst, the barracked security and assistance service of the civil defense; Luftwaffenhelferinnen, the female Luftwaffe auxiliaries; Luftwaffenhelfer, underage male youth serving anti-aircraft batteries between school or work; Flakwehrmänner, male workers in reserved occupations  serving anti-aircraft batteries during air-raids. The Wehrmachtgefolge also contained units from paramilitary organizations, as far as they were subordinated to the Luftwaffe during the war, such as: Reichsarbeitsdienst, National Socialist Motor Corps, and Organisation Todt.

Overview

Military personnel
Soldaten, or military personnel in a limited sense, consisted of officers, noncommissioned officers and airmen, belonging to the flying troops, fallschirmjäger, air defense artillery, air signal troops, construction units, and medical units, as well the Luftwaffe ground combat units, such as  the Division "Hermann Goering" and the Luftwaffe field divisions. They also included the special career officers such as medical officers and directors of music, and the special troop officers such as supply officers and judge advocates.

Officers

Corps
The commissioned officers of the Luftwaffe could either be non-restricted or restricted line officers, or non-line officers. Non-restricted officers were Truppenoffiziere, troop officers, and Generalstabsoffiziere, general staff officers. Resttricted line officers were ordnance officers and engineering officers. Non-line officers were of two kinds, special career officers, Offiziere der Sonderlaufbahnen, contained medical officers and directors of music, while Truppensonderdienst, the special troop officers, were created in 1944 by the transfer of supply officers and judge advocates from the military officials class.

The Air force engineer officers were to replace the Air engineers of the military officials class, but only a very limited number of such officers were trained before the end of the war. No such officer had reached higher rank than First Lieutenant at the end of the war. The highest rank of the Ordnance officer corps was Colonel.

Commissions
The officers of the several corps were listed in different seniority lists depending on their service conditions:

Ergängzungsoffiziere were former officers born in 1882 or later, serving in staff and administrative positions. Offiziere der Beurlaubtenstandes were reserve officers; consisting of Reserveoffiziere (under 35 years of age), and Landwehroffiziere (35 years old and older) until 1940, when the two categories were merged. Kriegsoffiziere were officers promoted from the ranks and given temporary commissions for the duration of the war. Offiziere zur Verfügung were former officers subject to recall at mobilization. Such officers were called Offiziere zur Dienstleistung when recalled.

Enlisted
Each branch of the Luftwaffe had a number of Dienstlaufbahngruppen (career groups) for non-commissioned officers and airmen, further subdivided into Dienstlaufbahnen (service careers).

Flying Troops
The Flying Troops had three career croups, Air Crew, Aircraft Engineering, and General Service.

Air Crew
Airplane Pílot, Aircraft Observer,  Auxiliary Observer, Bombardier, Air Signaller (Aerial Gunner), Flight Engineer (Aerial Gunner), Aerial Gunner, and Paratrooper.
Aircraft Engineering
Aircraft Engineering Technician, Airframe Mechanic, Airplane Engine Mechanic, Airplane Electrical Mechanic, Airplane Precision Mechanic, Airplane Bomb Armorer, Airplane Weapons Armorer, Aerial Photography Technician, Airplane Signals Mechanic, and Parachute Rigger and Survival Equipmentman.
General Service
Ground Communications, Motor Transportation, Supply Clerk, Ammunition Technician, Hauptfeldwebel (First Sergeant), HQ Sergeant, Supply Technician (Automotive), Supply Technician (Aircraft), Supply Technician (Weapons/Gas Protection), Supply Technician (General), Clothing Clerk, Accountant, Subsistence NCO, Administrative Clerk, Small Boat Crew, Air Traffic Control, Musician, Medical Technician, and Military Official Candidate.

Air Defense Artillery
The Air Defense Artillery had two careers groups, Artillery, and General Service.

Artillery
Anti-aircraft Artillery Personnel, Motor Transportation Personnel, Communications.

General Service
The same as the general service of the Flying Troops, with the addition of Supply Technician (Communications), and Supply Technician (Searchlight), and without Supply Technician (Aircraft).

Air Signal Troops
The Air Signal Troops had two career groups, Signals, and General Service.

Signals
General, Flight Radio Operator, Aircraft Radio, Radio Technical Sergeant, Telephone Technical Sergeant,  Supply Technician (Communications), Armorer.

General Service
The same as the general service of the Flying Troops, without Supply Technician (Aircraft).

Other branches
In addition to the three major branches, flying troops, air defense artillery, and air signal troops, the Luftwaffe had several other branches. In existence at the beginning of the war was the medical troops (Sanitätstruppen), and the Reichsluftaufsicht or the National Flying Safety Service, which was staffed both by military personnel and a special group of Beamten (see below). During the war special Luftwaffe construction units (Luftwaffen-Bauverbände) were added. A special ground-combat unit General Göring existed since 1935, and airborne Fallschirmjäger units since 1938; during the war both expanded into army corps, with the same complement of ground-combat branches that existed in the army. In addition, the Luftwaffe in 1942 formed a number field divisions of excess personnel, that, however, after about a year was absorbed by the German Army. There were even veterinary units; the enlisted men belonging to the Luftwaffe, and the veterinary officers to the army.

Sonderführer 
In the Luftwaffe war time tables of organization, certain positions could be filled with personnel not possessing the required military training, if properly trained personnel were not available. Such Sonderführer (Specialist Leaders), should have a civilian education or training qualifying them for the technical side of the position to be filled, and preferably some sort of leadership experience or training. Specialist Leaders did not hold military rank as such, but had titles that denoted the equivalent rank level of the positions held. If they were not needed as Specialist Leaders any more, they would to revert to their basic military rank. Specialist Leaders with the equivalent rank level of non-commissioned officers were abolished in 1942; the incumbents transferred to the non-commissioned corps if qualified. 
{| class="wikitable mw-collapsible mw-collapsed" style="min-width:50em"
|+ style="background:lavender" | Rank equivalents and titles of Luftwaffe Sonderführers
|- 
!Equivalent rank level!! Level  !! General titles ||  Titles for interpreters || Titles for doctors
|-
|Unteroffizier|| Specialist Leader in the position of a Sergeant  || Sonderfüher (G)  || -||-
|-
|Oberfeldwebel|| Specialist Leader in the position of a Technical Sergeant || Sonderfüher (O)|| - || -
|-
|Leutnant || Specialist Leader in the position of a First or Second Lieutenant || Sonderfüher (Z)|| Dolmetscher (Z) || Hilfsartz |-
|Hautpmann || Specialist Leader in the position of a Captain ||Sonderfüher (K)|| Dolmetscher (K) || Kriegsarzt|-
|Major ||Specialist Leader in the position of a Field Officer || Sonderfüher (B)|| - || Oberkriegsarzt|-
|}

Military officials

Military officials were civil servants that served in the Luftwaffe in technical, administrative, legal, and other positions. They were not civilian employees, as they were uniformed, often serving with advanced units on air bases in enemy territory. Yet the personnel structure of the military officials were not military - with officers, non-commissioned officers, and airmen - but the same as the ordinary civil service, with four different career levels. Although they wore insignia denoting their equivalent rank, they did not have military ranks, but civil service grades, and were not paid after the military pay scales, but according to their civil service grade. Most officials were Wehrmachtbeamte, but there were also four special groups of military officials: the air engineers, the air navigators, the aircraft pilots, and the flying safety officials.Henner & Böhler 2014, p. 142.

Most of the military officials of the Luftwaffe were non-commissioned officers having completed their 12 year's service obligation. After being given a civilian education at an administrative or technical military school (Wehrmachtfachschule), they entered the ranks of the military officials as military candidates (Militäranwärter). Abschlussprüfung I (first level exam) gave access to the middle career, while a second level exam opened up the elevated career. The elevated career was also open to young men with Abitur having completed the two your compulsory military service. The higher service was recruited through direct-entry candidates with a university degree, most of which also were reserve officers.

Air Engineer Corps
Becoming a member of the  Ingenieurkorps der Luftwaffe required completion of the two year compulsory military service, being commissioned as a reserve officer, and having a Diplomingenieur-degree in aircraft construction, as well having passed the state exam for Flugbaumeisters (aircraft designers). Diploma Engineers with three years employment as civilian engineers of the Luftwaffe were also accepted.Henner & Böhler 2014, p. 143.

Air Navigator Corps
The Nautikerkorps der Luftwaffe was founded in 1938, for air surveying and non-combat navigation duties; all members were military officials of the elevated career recruited as Militäranwärter from former sergeant-navigators. New appointments in the corps ended in 1941. Suitable and willing navigators where then transferred to the officer corps of the flying troops. Of the 295 officials in the navigator corps, 81 had transferred to the officer corps at the beginning of 1942.

Aircraft Pilot Corps
The Flugzeugführerkorps was created in 1940, its members being former sergeant-pilots that began their new career as Militäranwärter of the elevated service. They served in positions as flight instructors, weather pilots, test pilots, and as pilots of other similar non-combat activities.

Flying Safety Officials
The Reichsluftaufsicht, the National Flying Safety Service, was staffed both with Soldaten and special group Beamten of the middle, elevated, and higher careers.

Wehrmachtbeamte
The Wehrmachtbeamte of the Luftwaffe were administrative, technical and legal specialists and craftsmen, belonging to a large number of Fachrichtungen (occupational groups), according to their profession, occupation or area of specialization. 

Occupational Groups of the Wehrmachtbeamte:

Source:

War-time officials 
The Beamte auf Kriegsdauer, were the military officialdom's equivalent of Sonderführer; a Luftwaffe member filling a Beamter-position in the tables of organization without having gone through the required training during the candidate period, but possessing adequate technical or professional competence to fill such a slot on an emergency basis. War-time officials were designated with the appendix a. Kr. (abbreviation for auf Kriegsdauer) after the grade title of the position they were filling. For example: Werkmeister a. Kr., or Regierungsinspektor a. Kr. The Air Engineer Corps, the Air Navigation Corps, and the Wehrmachtbeamte were all augmented with war-time officials. By 1944 the war-time Wehrmachtbeamte of the higher service were placed in pay grade A2c2; of the elevated service, in pay grade A4c2; of the middle career in pay grade A8a; and of the lower career in pay grade A10b. War-time engineers and navigators were placed in pay grades JL5 or JL8 depending on position filled.

Luftwaffe auxiliaries
Before and during the war, the Wehrmachtgefolge, or the auxiliaries, of the Luftwaffe contained the following categories: 
 Civilian workers and salaried employees of the Luftwaffe, such as air base fire fighters, Fliegerisch tätigen Angestellten der Luftwaffe (aviation employees of the Luftwaffe), and the maritime personnel of the  Luftwaffe Seenotdienst.
 Civilian workers and salaried employees assigned tasks in the Luftwaffe by their employers, such as personnel of the Frontreparaturbetriebe (front repair stations).
 Civilian employees of contractors performing jobs for the Luftwaffe Male personnel of the Civil Defense Security and Assistance Service, the Sicherheits- und Hilfsdienst, until the 1942 transfer to the Ordnungspolizei as the Luftschutzpolizei.
 Male personnel of the air raid warning service, the Luftschutzwarndienst. 
 Female auxiliaries of the Luftwaffe, the Luftwaffenhelferinnen.
 Flakwehrmänner, that is male workers and salaried employees, either overage or in reserved occupations, who in addition to their regular work manned local anti-aircraft batteries (Heimatflak).
 Luftwaffenhelfer, 15–17-year-old male high school students and apprentices, who in addition to school or work manned Heimatflak-batteries.
 Staff and members of detachments from paramilitary organizations attached to the Luftwaffe, such as NSKK-Transportregiment Luftwaffe of the National Socialist Motor Corps, OT-Einsatz Luftwaffe of the Organisation Todt, and TENO-Einsatzgruppe Luftwaffe of the Technische Nothilfe.
 RAD-Kriegshilfsdienst – female members of the Reichsarbeitsdienst in extended war service, as far as it was fulfilled in attachment to the Luftwaffe.
Source:

References
Notes

Cited literature
 Absolon, Rudolf (1969). Die Wehrmacht im Dritten Reich. Band V. (Schriften des Bundesarchivs). Boppard am Rhein: Boldt.
 Adler, Hermann & Rückens, Rolf (1941). Deutsche Luftwaffenkalender. Bamberg: J.W. Reindl Verlag.
 Brand, Arthur (1942). Das Deutsche Beamtengesetz. Berlin: Springer-Verlag.
 Davis, Brian L. (1999). Uniforms and Insignia of the Luftwaffe. Arms & Armour.
 Deutsches Reichsgesetzblatt Teil I, 1867-1945. [Cited as RGBl I]
 Henner, Sigurd & Böhler, Wolfgang (2014). Die Deutsche Wehrmacht. Dienstgrade und Waffenfarbe der Luftwaffe 1939-1945.  Stuttgart: Motorbuch Verlag.
 Moll, Martin (1997).  "Führer-Erlasse" 1939-1945. Stuttgart: Franz Steiner Verlag.
 Richhardt, Dirk (2002). Auswahl und Ausbildung junger Offiziere 1930–1945. Diss. Marburg: Philipps–Universität Marburg.
 Schlicht, Adolf & Angolia, John R (1999). Die deutsche Wehrmacht. Uniformierung und Ausrüstung 1933-1945. Band 3: Die Luftwaffe. Stuttgart: Motorbuch Verlag.
 Supreme Headquarters Allied Expeditionary Forcee (1945). Handbook for unit commanders (Germany). Revised edition. [Cited as SHAPE 1945]
 United States War Department (1944). Military occupational classification of enlisted personnel. TM 12-427. Washington, DC: United States Government Printing Office. [Cited as TM 12-427]
 United States War Department (1945). Handbook on German military forces. TM-E 30-451.'' Washington, DC: United States Government Printing Office. [Cited as  TM-E 30-451]

See also
 Organization of the Luftwaffe (1933–45)
Ranks and insignia of the Luftwaffe (1935–45)

Luftwaffe
Military history of Germany during World War II
Military ranks of Germany